Matthias Mellinghaus (born 10 May 1965 in Iserlohn, North Rhine-Westphalia) is a competition rower and Olympic champion for West Germany.

Mellinghaus won a gold medal in coxed eights at the 1988 Summer Olympics in Seoul, as a member of the rowing team from West Germany.

References

1965 births
Living people
People from Iserlohn
Sportspeople from Arnsberg (region)
Olympic rowers of West Germany
Rowers at the 1988 Summer Olympics
Olympic gold medalists for West Germany
Olympic medalists in rowing
West German male rowers
Medalists at the 1988 Summer Olympics